Forwood is a surname that may refer to:

Anthony Forwood (real name Ernest Lytton Leslie Forwood) (1915–88), English actor
Sir Arthur Forwood (1836–98), English merchant and politician (brother of William Bower)
Bill (William) Forwood (born 1946), Australian politician
Charles Rossiter Forwood (1826–90), English-born Australian lawyer
Gareth Forwood (1945–2007), British actor
Jennifer Forwood (born 1939), English peer
William Bower Forwood (1840–1928), English merchant and politician (brother of Anthony)
William H. Forwood (1838–1915), American surgeon

See also
Forwood baronets